Borysów may refer to:
Barysaw, Belarus - Borysów in Polish
Borysów, Lublin Voivodeship (east Poland)